Rentoniidae is a family of beetles belonging to Cleroidea. The species were originally included in the family Trogossitidae. They are around 1–2 mm in length, with spherical bodies. Members of the family are native to the Southern Hemisphere, being found in Australia, New Zealand, New Caledonia and South America. They have been found on flowers, under the bark of dead trees, and in leaf litter, and members are known to be pollenivorous or fungivorous.

Genera 
 Australiodes Endrödy-Younga, 1960, New Zealand
 Globorentonium Lawrence & Slipinski, 2013 Australia, southern Brazil
 Parentonium Crowson, 1970 Australia
 Rentonellum Crowson, 1966 Brazil, New Zealand
 Rentonidium Crowson, 1966 New Zealand
 Rentonium Crowson, 1966 Chile, New Zealand

An undescribed species is also known from New Caledonia.

References 

Cleroidea
Taxa named by Roy Crowson
Taxa described in 1966